The 2021 UK Championship (officially the 2021 Cazoo UK Championship) was a professional snooker tournament that took place from 23 November to 5 December 2021 at the York Barbican, in York, England. The event was the first Triple Crown and fifth ranking event of the 2021–22 snooker season. The tournament featured a prize fund of £1,009,000, with the winner receiving £200,000. It was sponsored by car retail company Cazoo and broadcast in the UK by the BBC and Eurosport.

Neil Robertson was the defending champion, having defeated Judd Trump 10–9 in the 2020 final, but he lost 2–6 in the first round to amateur John Astley. Many other top seeds exited the tournament in the early rounds, with 11 of the world's top 13 ranked players eliminated before the last-16 stage. For the first time in the tournament's history, no top-16 player reached the final, which was contested between China's Zhao Xintong and Belgium's Luca Brecel, both of whom made their first appearances in a Triple Crown final. Zhao won the event with a 10–5 victory in the final to claim his first ranking title. The event featured 119 century breaks, with Gary Wilson making the highest, his fourth career maximum break, in his first-round match against Ian Burns.

Aged 24, Zhao became the youngest winner of the UK Championship since Trump in 2011. He became the fourth non-British winner in the tournament's history, after Ireland's Patsy Fagan, China's Ding Junhui, and Australia's Robertson. He also became the fourth player from mainland China to win a ranking title, after Ding, Liang Wenbo and Yan Bingtao. His win enabled him to enter the top 16 for the first time and secure a place in the second Triple Crown event of the season, the 2022 Masters.

Overview
The 2021 UK Championship was a professional snooker tournament that took place from 23 November to 5 December 2021 at the York Barbican, in York, England. The UK Championship was first held in 1977 as the United Kingdom Professional Snooker Championship, open to British residents only. At the 1984 event, it became a ranking tournament open to players of any nationality, which it has remained ever since. The event was the first Triple Crown tournament, and the fifth ranking event of the 2021–22 snooker season. There were 128 participants, 119 players from the World Snooker Tour, and 9 invited amateur players.

The defending champion was Neil Robertson, who defeated Judd Trump 10–9 in the previous year's final. The tournament was broadcast live in the United Kingdom by BBC Sport, and shown on Eurosport in Europe. Worldwide, the event was covered by China Central Television and Superstars Online in China, and by Sky Sport in New Zealand. It was simulcast in Hong Kong by Now TV; DAZN covered the event across Canada, Brazil and the United States. It was sponsored by vehicle rental company Cazoo.

Prize fund
The breakdown of prize money for the event is shown below:

 Winner: £200,000
 Runner-up: £80,000
 Semi-final: £40,000
 Quarter-final: £24,500
 Last 16: £17,000
 Last 32: £12,000
 Last 64: £6,500
 Highest : £15,000
 Total: £1,009,000

Summary 

All matches other than the final were held as the best-of-11 frames. In the first round, defending champion Neil Robertson lost 2–6 to amateur player John Astley, but later revealed that he had been diagnosed with pulsatile tinnitus and would have withdrawn from the tournament regardless. Shaun Murphy, the sixth seed, lost 5–6 to another amateur player Si Jiahui, and made comments afterward on BBC Radio 5 Live suggesting that amateur players should not be permitted to compete in professional events. Robertson, Mark Williams and Mark Selby agreed with Murphy's comments, although the World Snooker Tour stated that giving amateurs the opportunity to compete in professional tournaments was a vital aspect of their development, and its chairman Steve Dawson stated that the drama caused by amateur players beating elite professionals had been "great for the sport". Critics on social media noted the irony that Murphy himself had attempted to qualify for golf's 2019 Open Championship as an amateur competitor. Thepchaiya Un-Nooh compiled five century breaks while defeating Stephen Hendry 6–1 in the first round, becoming only the fourth player after Fergal O'Brien, Trump, and Matthew Selt to make that many in a best-of-11 match.

Reigning world champion Selby (seeded 2), Williams (9), Ding Junhui (10), and reigning Masters champion Yan Bingtao (12) all lost in the last 64. Williams led world number 56 Anthony Hamilton 3–0, but lost the match 5–6, after which he apologised for falling asleep during the sixth frame, stating he had been feeling unwell following a case of COVID-19. Ding lost 3–6 to world number 55 Sam Craigie, guaranteeing that he would drop out of the top 16 after the tournament and be ineligible to compete in the Masters for the first time since 2006. After Craigie potted the final pink in frame eight, referee Maike Kesseler awarded him the frame for a 5–3 lead while the cue ball was still in motion. Craigie then placed his cue on the table and the cue ball collided with it. Speaking for the BBC studio, pundit Ken Doherty argued that the referee should have called a foul, respotted the pink, and given Ding the opportunity to come back to the table and attempt to level the match at 4–4; however, the frame had been awarded to Craigie prematurely. Speaking on Eurosport, pundit Alan McManus also criticised Kesseler for awarding the frame before the cue ball had come to rest. Yan lost 3–6 to world number 53 Ben Woollaston.

Five more seeded players exited in the round of 32. Third seed Trump, the previous year's runner-up, suffered a shock 3–6 defeat to world number 35 Selt. John Higgins (7) and Mark Allen (11) fell victim to comebacks by their opponents, with Higgins losing 5–6 to Zhao Xintong after leading 5–3, and Allen losing 5–6 to David Gilbert after leading 5–2. Eleven of the world's top-13-ranked players were eliminated before the last-16 stage of the tournament. Overall, just five seeded players reached the last 16: Ronnie O'Sullivan (4), Kyren Wilson (5), Barry Hawkins (14), Jack Lisowski (15), and Anthony McGill (16). All five seeds progressed to the quarter-finals, along with Zhao, Brecel, and world number 102 Andy Hicks.

In the quarter-finals, Wilson defeated seven-time champion O'Sullivan. During their match, O'Sullivan repeatedly complained to referee Jan Verhaas about audience members distracting him as they entered and exited the auditorium, and interrupted his breaks to sit in his chair for several minutes at a time while the crowd settled down. He also requested that a photographer be removed from the arena floor. O'Sullivan came from 3–5 behind to level the match, but Wilson won the deciding frame for a 6–5 victory. The other quarter-finals were more one-sided as Brecel defeated McGill 6–2, Zhao won six consecutive frames to beat Lisowski 6–2, and Hawkins defeated Hicks 6–1. In the first semi-final, Brecel defeated Wilson 6–4, compiling four century breaks and three other breaks over 50, to become the first player from continental Europe to reach a Triple Crown final. In the second semi-final, Zhao defeated Hawkins 6–1, making a century break and an additional five breaks over 70, to reach his first ranking final.

The final was played on 5 December 2021 between Brecel and Zhao as the best-of-19 frames held over two . It was the first in the tournament’s history not to feature a player in the top 16 in the world rankings, and the second not to feature a player from the United Kingdom (Australian Robertson defeated Chinese player Liang Wenbo in the 2015 final). Zhao led 5–3 after the afternoon session, and then won five of the seven frames played in the evening session to defeat Brecel 10–5 and win the first ranking title of his career. Zhao became the tournament's fourth non-British winner, after Ireland’s Patsy Fagan, China's Ding, and Australia’s Robertson. He also became the fourth player from mainland China to win a ranking title, after Ding, Liang, and Yan. He moved up from 26th to ninth in the world rankings, which secured his place in the 2022 Masters in January. As runner-up, Brecel moved up the rankings from 40th to 18th.

Tournament draw
The draw for the event is shown below. Players in bold denote match winners.

Top half

Section 1

Section 2

Section 3

Section 4

Bottom half

Section 5

Section 6

Section 7

Section 8

Finals

Final

Century breaks
A total of 119 century breaks were made during the tournament. Gary Wilson made the highest, his fourth career maximum break, in his first-round match against Ian Burns.

147, 104  Gary Wilson
142, 115  Fergal O'Brien
139, 131, 120, 115, 108  Ronnie O'Sullivan
139  Li Hang
138, 129, 128, 103  Dominic Dale
138  Zhang Anda
136, 129, 107, 106, 100  Thepchaiya Un-Nooh
136, 118  Ben Woollaston
135, 133, 130, 117  Anthony McGill
135  Louis Heathcote
135  Andy Hicks
134, 131, 112  John Higgins
134, 129  Ding Junhui
134, 101  Ali Carter
133, 130, 112, 112, 105, 102  Luca Brecel
132, 131, 109  Graeme Dott
132, 100  Judd Trump
131, 128, 121, 119, 103, 100  Noppon Saengkham
131, 115  David Gilbert
131  Gerard Greene
130  Aaron Hill
130  Ashley Hugill
129, 102  Ricky Walden
128  Jordan Brown
128  Matthew Selt
128  Craig Steadman
127, 105, 104, 100  Stephen Maguire
126, 110  Jack Lisowski
125  Duane Jones
124  Neil Robertson
122, 121, 118, 102, 102  Cao Yupeng
122, 120, 120, 114, 110, 100  Zhao Xintong
121, 117, 115, 113, 110, 102  Kyren Wilson
120  Ian Burns
120  Gao Yang
119  John Astley
118  Yuan Sijun
115, 109  Wu Yize
115, 105  Hossein Vafaei
114, 113  Robbie Williams
114  Ben Hancorn
113  Stuart Carrington
113  Peter Lines
113  Kurt Maflin
112, 106  Mark Williams
111  Simon Lichtenberg
111  Joe Perry
110  Fan Zhengyi
107, 100  Yan Bingtao
107  Scott Donaldson
105  Ashley Carty
105  Sam Craigie
104  David Grace
104  Allan Taylor
103, 103  Barry Hawkins
103  Martin Gould
102  Michael White
101  Mark King
101  Lei Peifan

References

External links
 

UK Championship
2021
UK Championship
UK Championship
UK Championship
Sport in York